The 2013 Copa de la Reina de Fútbol was the 31st edition of the Spanish women's football national cup. It ran from 12 May to 16 June 2013 and was contested by the best eight teams in the 2012–13 Spanish Championship, four more teams than in the previous edition. Both the quarterfinals and the semifinals were two-legged ties, instead of the final four held in the headquarters of the RFEF in the three previous editions.

Qualification

Top eight positions of the 2012-13 Spanish First Division.

Qualified teams by community

Results

Bracket

Quarterfinals

1st leg

2nd leg

Semifinals

1st leg

2nd leg

Final

References

Women
Copa de la Reina
Copa de la Reina de Fútbol seasons